Kickboxing  at the 2021 Islamic Solidarity Games  was held in Konya, Turkey from 16 to 18 August 2022 in Selçuklu Municipality Sports Hall.

The Games were originally scheduled to take place from 20 to 29 August 2021 in Konya, Turkey. In May 2020, the Islamic Solidarity Sports Federation (ISSF), who are responsible for the direction and control of the Islamic Solidarity Games, postponed the games as the 2020 Summer Olympics were postponed to July and August 2021, due to the global COVID-19 pandemic.

Medalists

Full contact

Men

Women

Low kick

Men

Women

Medal table

Participating nations
A total of 180 athletes from 15 nations competed in kickboxing at the 2021 Islamic Solidarity Games:

References

External links 
Official website
Results book

2021 Islamic Solidarity Games
2021
Islamic Solidarity Games
International kickboxing competitions hosted by Turkey